Latastia  ornata is a species of lizard endemic to  Guinea-Bissau.

References

Reptiles described in 1940
Latastia
Taxa named by Albert Monard
Endemic fauna of Guinea-Bissau